Eyal Sivan is an Israeli documentary filmmaker, theoretician and scholar based in Paris, France.

Early life 

Eyal Sivan is a Filmmaker, Writer and theoretician born in 1964 in Haifa, Israel; raised in Jerusalem; and based in Europe since 1985.

As a teenager, Sivan abandoned formal education to dedicate himself to his hobbies, which were photography and political activism.

Career 

After working as a professional commercial photographer in Tel Aviv, he left Israel in 1985 and settled in Paris. He now splits his time between Europe and Israel. 
Known for his controversial films, Sivan has produced and directed more than a dozen political documentaries. Common State (2012), Jaffa (2009) and Route 181 (2003) won awards at various festivals.

Sivan's films are regularly exhibited in art exhibitions including Documenta, Manifesta and ICP New York. His work touches on such themes as the representation of political crime; the political use of memory; the ethics of documentary filmmaking; and the Israeli-Palestinian conflict. 

He is the founder and artistic director of the Paris-based documentary film company Momento ! and of the film distribution agency Scalpel. He created South Cinema Notebooks, a journal of cinema criticism published by the Sapir Academic College in Ashkelon.

In response to a question by Aljazeera as to why so many "progressive and anti-Zionist academics, activists, and artists" are fleeing Israel, Sivan responded: "The veil of democracy is being ripped from Israeli faces."

Academic postings

Professor, Amsterdam University of the Arts, Nederlands Film Academy, Nederlands
Associate Professor, Media Production, University of East London, School of Arts and Digital Industries, United Kingdom
Honorary Fellow, European Centre for Palestinian Studies, University of Exeter, United Kingdom
Visiting Professor, Netherlands Film Academy, Amsterdam, The Netherlands
Visiting Professor, Nuova Accademia di Belle Arti, Milan, Italy
Visiting Professor, Sapir Academic College, School of Sound and Visual Arts, Ashkelon, Israel

Filmography
 2012 Common State, Potential Conversation 
 2009 Jaffa, the Orange's Clockwork
 2007 Citizens K, the Twin Brothers
 2005 Faces of the Fallen 
 2004 I Love You All / Aus Liebe Zum Volk (co-directed with Audrey Maurion)
 2003 Route 181, Fragments of a Journey in Palestine-Israel (co-directed with Michel Khleifi)
 2001 On the Top of the Descent 
 1999 The Specialist, Portrait of a Modern Criminal
 1997 Burundi, under Terror
 1996 Itsembatsemba, Rwanda One Genocide Later
 1995 Aqabat-Jaber, Peace with no Return?
 1994 Jerusalem(s), Borderline Syndrome
 1993 Itgaber, He Will Overcome - Conversations with Yeshayahou Lebowitz
 1991 Israland 
 1990 Izkor, Slaves of Memory
 1987 Aqabat-Jaber, Passing Through

Other visual works
 2012 Towards a common archive, testimonies of Zionist veterans of 1948. Multi screens video show.
 2012  Montage Interdit. Berlin Documentary Forum 2 New practices across disciplines. Haus der Kulturen der Welt [www.hkw.de]
 2010  Documentary moments 1 : Renaissance. Berlin Documentary Forum 1 New practices across disciplines. Haus der Kulturen der Welt
 2009  Fragmented memory of spectatorship. Top 10 documentary programme IDFA Amsterdam 
 2008 Happy birthdays, towards a common archive - fragment 1. Multi screens video Installation
 2001 Scalpel / Skalpel. (concept & artistic director) TV magazine for ARTE
 1994 Jerusalem, Jerusalems. Conception and direction of a Theme evening for ARTE
 1988 Progressive list for Peace. TV spots

References

External links

 Eyal Sivan on culture base www.culturbase.net
The Barber Trial: Sivan vs. Finkielkraut Cabinet Magazine Thomas Keenan and Eyal Weizman www.cabinetmagazine.org

1964 births
Living people
Israeli documentary film directors
People from Haifa